George Maxwell Downing (born April 1963) is a property magnate from Liverpool, England. He made his fortune in the property and construction sectors. It is estimated that he has a wealth of around £500 million. He is a resident of Verbier, Switzerland.

George Maxwell Downing was born in April 1963.

In 2007 he was awarded the DLA Piper Business Person of the Year accolade for his continued investment within Merseyside.

In 2010, Downing was reported by the Liverpool Echo as being "Liverpool's largest commercial landlord", and the owner of the Port of Liverpool building and the Capital Building.

In 2016, Downing was in favour of Brexit.

Downing is married and has three sons. His youngest son, Bay Downing was a student at the University of Tampa, Florida, in 2016.

References

Living people
Businesspeople from Liverpool
1963 births
British landlords